Andres Dellatorre (born 9 July 1980) is an Argentine tennis player.

Dellatorre has a career high ATP singles ranking of 210 achieved on 6 October 2003. He also has a career high doubles ranking of 209 achieved on 10 January 2005.

Dellatorre has won 1 ATP Challenger doubles title at the 2004 Tampere Open.

Tour titles

Doubles

References

External links
 
 

1980 births
Living people
Argentine male tennis players
Tennis players from Buenos Aires
21st-century Argentine people